Ladies Man is an American television sitcom series created by Chris Thompson, starring Alfred Molina as husband, father, son, ex-husband and son-in-law who lives with a number of women under one roof. The show was first broadcast on September 20, 1999, and lasted for two seasons on CBS until June 27, 2001. The series co-starred Betty White and is perhaps most memorable for reuniting White with both her Golden Girls co-stars Rue McClanahan and Estelle Getty in one of the later episodes.

Cast
Alfred Molina as Jimmy Stiles, a woodworker
Sharon Lawrence as Donna Stiles, Jimmy's wife
Betty White as Mitzi Stiles, Jimmy's mother
Dixie Carter as Peaches (season 1), Donna's mother
Park Overall as Claire Stiles (season 1), Jimmy's ex-wife
Mariam Parris (pilot episode only), Shawna Waldron (season 1) and Kaley Cuoco (season 2) as Bonnie Stiles, Jimmy and Claire's teenage daughter
Katie Volding (pilot episode only) and Alexa Vega as Wendy Stiles, Jimmy and Donna's young daughter
Stephen Root as Gene, Jimmy's golfing buddy
Rue McClanahan as Aunt Lou (recurring, 2 episodes)

Episodes

Season 1: 1999–2000

Season 2: 2001

References

External links

1999 American television series debuts
2001 American television series endings
1990s American sitcoms
2000s American sitcoms
CBS original programming
English-language television shows
Television series by CBS Studios
Television series by Sony Pictures Television